Underground Garage is the name shared by two related but different radio outlets that present rock 'n' roll and garage rock on the radio: a syndicated show and a satellite radio station. Steven Van Zandt, best known as a guitarist in Bruce Springsteen & The E Street Band, is the founder and supervisor of both outlets. Both outlets play a mixture of past and current garage rock, and feature one song as "The Coolest Song in the World This Week."

Station overview, shows
Little Steven's Underground Garage
The weekly syndicated radio show broadcasts under the full title Little Steven's Underground Garage, and can be heard on over 200 terrestrial FM radio stations in 130 major cities in the United States and in many countries outside the US.  The two-hour show is written, hosted, and produced by Van Zandt.  The show debuted on approximately 30 US stations in April 2002 and has become one of the fastest-growing syndicated music radio shows in the US. It is heard by approximately one million listeners in the US each week, and is currently distributed by Sun Broadcast Group.

Underground Garage radio channel
The other outlet, named Underground Garage, is a 24-hour satellite radio channel heard in the USA & Canada on Sirius XM Radio channel 21 and via Dish Network satellite TV, and heard worldwide on Sirius/XM Internet Radio. In musical terms, the radio channel is an extension of Van Zandt's own weekly radio show and shares the same philosophy.

The radio channel is programmed and run by Van Zandt, and are hosted by a team of personalities personally selected by Van Zandt. On-air hosts on the channel have included original Rolling Stones manager/producer Andrew Loog Oldham, punk rock singer Handsome Dick Manitoba, Manfred "The Mighty Manfred" Jones of The Woggles, Palmyra Delran of The Friggs, Stray Cats drummer Slim Jim Phantom, New York singer/songwriter Jesse Malin, television actor Michael Des Barres, Ko Melina of Ko and the Knockouts, Kelly Ogden of The Dollyrots, veteran FM radio deejays Kid Leo, Rodney Bingenheimer and Bill Kelly, rock entrepreneur Kim Fowley, actor Drew Carey,  and musician/producer Genya Ravan of Goldie & the Gingerbreads. "Chris Carter's British Invasion", hosted by Chris Carter, appears on the channel on weekends.

As of February 19, 2007, Van Zandt began hosting a regular spot Monday through Friday at 11am, 3pm, and 7pm in between each program.

Live shows
Little Steven's Underground Garage periodically co-sponsors shows, and two events in late April 2014 are scheduled to feature bands with "Coolest Songs," including The Connection, John & Brittany, The Jellybricks, and Palmyra Delran. The shows will be hosted by Underground Garage DJ Handsome Dick Manitoba.

Approach to music history

The music format of the weekly terrestrial radio show and the 24/7 satellite radio channel is based on Van Zandt's approach to rock 'n' roll history. Van Zandt believes that rock 'n' roll is a continuum of the early 1950s onwards and that it is artificial and counter-productive to isolate music by the decade it was created. The Underground Garage presents music from every decade since the beginnings of rock 'n' roll in the early 1950s to the present day.

Stylistically, the format's offerings span such genres and categories as garage rock, acid rock, girl groups, British Invasion, psychedelic music, rockabilly, surf rock, Motown, proto-punk, power pop and punk rock. The music is fully integrated so that listeners hear recordings by rock pioneers such as Chuck Berry, Bo Diddley, Little Richard and Elvis Presley juxtaposed with records by present-day garage bands like The Contrast – and multiple artists from the four decades between.

Van Zandt has stated that he hopes to draw younger listeners to the historic acts that paved the way for today's rock, and older listeners to discover the artists carrying on the tradition. He has described the format playlist as featuring "the bands that influenced the Ramones, the bands that were influenced by the Ramones, and the Ramones."

"The Coolest Song in the World This Week"

On both the Sirius XM channel and on the syndicated show, one song is proclaimed as "The Coolest Song in the World This Week."  At the end of 2006, listeners were invited to choose among the 52 songs to pick the year's best.  The results were as follows:
 The Woggles: "It's Not About What I Want" 
 The Charms: "So Romantic"
 Anderson Council: "Pinkerton's Assorted Colours"
 Primal Scream: "Country Girl"
 New York Dolls: "Dance Like A Monkey"
 The Shys: "Never Gonna Die"
 Joan Jett & The Blackhearts: "Everyone Knows"
 The Raconteurs: "Steady, As She Goes"
 The Maggots: "King Of The Freaks"
 The Holograms: "Are You Ready For It"

The same concept was applied in 2009, with listeners voting at the end of the year for their favorite "Coolest Song in the World This Week."  The 2009 results are as follows:

 The Noisettes: "Never Forget You"
 Tinted Windows: "Take me Back"
 The Doughboys: "I'm Not Your Man"
 The Raveonettes: "Last Dance"
 The Chesterfield Kings: "Up and Down"
 Locksley: "There's a Love"
 The Yum Yums: "Too Good to be True"
 The Verbs: "Burnt Out Star"
 Cocktail Slippers: "St. Valentine's Day Massacre"
 The Silver Brazilians: "Kate Winslet"

In addition to selecting a "Coolest Song in the World This Week" and voting for "Coolest Song in the World This Year," at the end of 2009, Little Steven also posted his "25 Coolest Albums of the Decade" and "50 Coolest Songs This Decade."  The top 10 Coolest Albums of the decade were:

 The Beatles: The Beatles in Mono
 Nuggets II: Original Artyfacts from the British Empire and Beyond, 1964–1969
 Bruce Springsteen: Magic
 The Chesterfield Kings: Psychedelic Sunrise
 Primal Scream: Riot City Blues
 Tinted Windows: Tinted Windows
 Foxboro Hot Tubs: Stop, Drop and Roll
 Cocktail Slippers: St. Valentine's Day Massacre
 Iggy Pop: Skull Ring
 Ray Davies: Other Peoples' Lives

The Top 10 "Coolest Songs of the Decade" were:

 Joey Ramone: "Maria Bartiromo"
 Bruce Springsteen & The E Street Band: "My Lucky Day"
 Oasis: "Lyla"
 Mick Jagger and John Lennon: "Too Many Cooks Spoil the Soup"
 Foxboro Hot Tubs: "Stop Drop and Roll"
 Locksley: "There's a Love"
 Cocktail Slippers: "Don't Ever Leave Me"
 Cheap Trick: "If It Takes a Lifetime'
 Primal Scream: "Dolls"
 Tinted Windows: "Nothing to Me"

Listening to the Underground Garage

The weekly syndicated radio show

 On FM radio stations in USA – Station details (click on "Radio Affiliates")
 On select radio stations in Europe/Asia Station details (click on "Radio Affiliates")
 In multiple nations worldwide via Voice of America Radio
 Norwegian radio channel P13

The 24/7 radio channel

 On satellite radio in North America: Sirius XM Satellite Radio channel 21
 On satellite TV in North America:   DISH Network Channel 6025
 On the internet in North America:  SiriusXM Radio

Core artists
The Stooges
The White Stripes
The Beatles
The Who
The Ramones
The Rolling Stones
Bo Diddley
The Hives
The Yardbirds
The Byrds
The Sex Pistols

See also
 List of Sirius Satellite Radio stations
 List of XM Satellite Radio stations

References

External links
 Official website of the Underground Garage
 SiriusXM: Underground Garage

Sirius Satellite Radio channels
XM Satellite Radio channels
Sirius XM Radio channels
American music radio programs
Steven Van Zandt